Aurimas Didžbalis (born 13 June 1991) is a Lithuanian Olympian weightlifter. He competes in the 94 kg class.

In 2012 Didžbalis tested positive in doping test and lost his three medals from the 2012 European Championships, and his spot at the 2012 Summer Olympics.

In 2014 Didžbalis has become the inaugural weightlifter from Lithuania to win a medal at any World Championships. In 2016, Didžbalis was the inaugural Lithuanian weightlifter medallist in an Olympic Games. He won the Lithuanian Male sportsperson of the year award.

Results

References

External links

15min profile

1991 births
Living people
Lithuanian male weightlifters
World Weightlifting Championships medalists
Sportspeople from Klaipėda
Lithuanian sportspeople in doping cases
Doping cases in weightlifting
Olympic weightlifters of Lithuania
Weightlifters at the 2016 Summer Olympics
Medalists at the 2016 Summer Olympics
Olympic bronze medalists for Lithuania
Olympic medalists in weightlifting
Universiade medalists in weightlifting
Universiade silver medalists for Lithuania
European Weightlifting Championships medalists
Medalists at the 2011 Summer Universiade
20th-century Lithuanian people
21st-century Lithuanian people